In mathematical finance, the Black–Derman–Toy model (BDT) is a popular short-rate model used in the pricing of bond options, swaptions and other interest rate derivatives; see . It is a one-factor model; that is, a single stochastic factor—the short rate—determines the future evolution of all interest rates. It was the first model to combine the mean-reverting behaviour of the short rate with the log-normal distribution, and is still widely used.

History
The model was introduced by Fischer Black, Emanuel Derman, and Bill Toy. It was first developed for in-house use by Goldman Sachs in the 1980s and was published in the Financial Analysts Journal in 1990. A personal account of the development of the model is provided in Emanuel Derman's memoir My Life as a Quant.

Formulae
Under BDT, using a binomial lattice, one calibrates the model parameters to fit both the current term structure of interest rates (yield curve), and the volatility structure for interest rate caps (usually as implied by the Black-76-prices for each component caplet); see aside. Using the calibrated lattice one can then value a variety of more complex interest-rate sensitive securities and interest rate derivatives.

Although initially developed for a lattice-based environment, the model has been shown to imply the following continuous stochastic differential equation:

where,
 = the instantaneous short rate at time t
 = value of the underlying asset at option expiry
 = instant short rate volatility
 = a standard Brownian motion under a risk-neutral probability measure;  its differential.

For constant (time independent) short rate volatility, the model is:

One reason that the model remains popular, is that the "standard" Root-finding algorithms—such as Newton's method (the secant method) or bisection—are very easily applied to the calibration. Relatedly, the model was originally described in algorithmic language, and not using stochastic calculus or martingales.

References
Notes

Articles

External links
R function for computing the Black–Derman–Toy short rate tree, Andrea Ruberto
Online: Black–Derman–Toy short rate tree generator Dr. Shing Hing Man, Thomson-Reuters' Risk Management
Online: Pricing A Bond Using the BDT Model Dr. Shing Hing Man, Thomson-Reuters' Risk Management
Excel BDT calculator and tree generator, Serkan Gur

Fixed income analysis
Short-rate models
Financial models
Options (finance)